The Laramie Trail is a 1944 American Western film directed by John English and written by J. Benton Cheney. The film stars Robert Livingston, Smiley Burnette, Linda Brent, Martin Garralaga, Emmett Lynn and John James. The film was released on April 3, 1944, by Republic Pictures.

Plot

Cast  
Robert Livingston as Johnny Rapidan 
Smiley Burnette as Frog
Linda Brent as Vega Alarcon
Martin Garralaga as Don Louis Alarcon
Emmett Lynn as Alfred 'Barfoot' Jennings
John James as Jimmy Terril
George J. Lewis as John Emerson, aka Blackie Mason
Leander de Cordova as Esteban
Slim Whitaker as Sheriff Jesse Law 
Bud Osborne as Deputy Chip
Bud Geary as Hefty Gurlak / Bill Smith
Roy Barcroft as Dick Rapidan

References

External links 

 

1944 films
American Western (genre) films
1944 Western (genre) films
Republic Pictures films
Films directed by John English
American black-and-white films
1940s English-language films
1940s American films